Köprüköy can refer to:

 Köprüköy
 Köprüköy, Bismil
 Köprüköy, İspir
 Köprüköy, Kırıkkale